The Libertarian Party of Wyoming (LPWY) is the affiliate of the Libertarian Party (LP) in Wyoming, headquartered in Riverton.  it is the third-largest political party in Wyoming by voter registration.

History

1970s

On July 26, 1976, the Libertarians started a petition drive so that their presidential candidate, Roger MacBride, could appear on the ballot. They were unsuccessful in gathering at least 6,300 signatures by September 28, but MacBride received 89 write-in votes (0.1%) in the general election.

1980s

On August 11, 1980, the Libertarians started a petition drive so that their presidential candidate, Ed Clark, could appear on the ballot. Around 11,000 signatures were collected and on September 18, the Secretary of State certified 6,522 of the signatures, which was more than the 6,469 required, allowing Clark to appear on the ballot as an independent candidate. Clark campaigned in Casper, Wyoming, and received 4,514 votes (2.6%) in the general election.

In 1984, four members of the Libertarian Party filed a lawsuit in the U.S. District Court in Cheyenne, Wyoming, to have eleven sections of Wyoming's election codes declared unconstitutional. Judge C. A. Brimmer ruled in favor of the Libertarians, but allowed Secretary of State Thyra Thomson to enforce the election code during the 1984 elections.

On February 8, 1986, the Libertarian and American parties of Wyoming merged to form the Wyoming American-Libertarian Party. However, on May 3, the party was dissolved after gathering 3,000 signatures, less than the 8,000 required to run candidates.

During the 1988 presidential election both Ron Paul, the Libertarian presidential nominee, and Andre Marrou, the party's vice-presidential nominee, campaigned in Sheridan, Wyoming. They received 2,026 votes (1.2%) in the general election.

2010s

In the 2002, 2006, and 2014 Wyoming Secretary of State elections the Libertarian nominees received over 10% of the popular vote giving the Libertarian Party major party status in Wyoming. Major party status allowed the party to nominate via primary unlike how minor parties nominate via convention.

In the 2018 election Bethany Baldes ran for a seat in the Wyoming House of Representatives from the 55th district. She was narrowly defeated by incumbent Representative David Miller by 53 votes.

2020s

During the 2020 elections Marshall Burt was elected to the Wyoming House of Representatives from the 39th district, becoming the fifth Libertarian elected to a state legislature and the first since 2002. He formed the Libertarian Caucus on February 16, 2022. Burt lost re-election to Republican Cody Wylie in 2022.

Voter registration

Electoral performance

Presidential

State legislative

Footnotes

References

External links
 

Wyoming
Political parties in Wyoming